The Admiral Spiridov class were a pair of monitors built for the Imperial Russian Navy in the late 1860s. The sister ships were assigned to the Baltic Fleet upon completion and remained there for their entire careers. Aside from several accidental collisions and one grounding, their careers were uneventful. They were reclassified as coast-defense ironclads in 1892 before they became training ships in 1900. The Admiral Spiridovs were stricken from the Navy List in 1907; one ship became a stationary target and the other a coal-storage barge. Their ultimate fates are unknown.

Design and description

By late 1863, the Russian Admiralty Board had begun planning for the second generation of ironclads to succeed those ships then under construction. They ordered eight ships, two fully rigged seagoing types and six coastal defense ships, in March 1864. The British shipbuilder Charles Mitchell submitted four different designs for the coastal defense vessels, two broadside ironclads and two turret ships. The Shipbuilding Technical Committee decided in August that the broadside designs would be based on the hull shape of the earlier  for better seaworthiness, but they would be armed with fewer, but more powerful guns, than the numerous smoothbore guns of the older ships. Two variants were worked out that differed in the fineness of the hull and draft.

In November the committee decided to revise the designs to use three gun turrets, each armed with a pair of massive American-designed  Rodman guns, although the armament was changed to  rifled muzzle-loading guns two months later. On 4 June 1865, Admiral Spiridov and Admiral Chichagov were ordered to the shallower-draft version of the two designs. Construction of the ships was repeatedly delayed by design changes and delayed deliveries of components. Both of the most significant design changes were related to the armor protection. Shortly after they were ordered the Admiralty Board realized that the specified  armor would be outclassed by the latest rifled gun and decided that the existing armor would be reinforced by an additional  armor plate and additional wooden backing inside the existing armor. The second change occurred after new  rifled guns were able to penetrate a replica of the armor scheme in June 1866. The Admiralty Board decided to significantly thicken the armor of the two ships and removed one gun turret to compensate for the weight of the extra armor in November. This major change added over 270,000 rubles to the cost of the ships and added more delays as Russian ironworks had problems rolling the thicker armor plates.

The ships were designed to displace , but turned out to be overweight and actually displaced . They were fitted with a plough-shaped ram. The Admiral Spiridovs had a double bottom and their hulls were subdivided by six main watertight bulkheads. Their crew consisted of 280 officers and crewmen.

Propulsion
The Admiral Spiridov class had a single two-cylinder horizontal direct-acting steam engine. The monitors also had a donkey boiler for the small steam engine that powered the ventilation fans and pumps. They were fitted with a light fore-and-aft sailing rig with three pole masts and a bowsprit.

Armament
The monitors were ultimately designed to be armed with four Obukhov 9-inch rifled guns, a pair in each Coles-type turret. An armored bulkhead separated the guns inside each turret. In 1874–75 the guns were replaced by a single  gun in each turret, based on a Krupp design. During the Russo-Turkish War of 1877–78 a 9-inch mortar was fitted to attack the thin deck armor of enemy ships, but accuracy was poor and they were later removed, probably in the early 1880s. An improved, more powerful, 11-inch gun was installed aboard Admiral Chichagov during the 1880s, although Admiral Spiridov retained her original guns until 1902, if not for the rest of her career.

Light guns for use against torpedo boats were added to the Admiral Spiridov-class ships during the Russo-Turkish War when a pair of 4-pounder  guns were mounted on the roofs of each gun turret. Other guns known have been fitted included  Baranov quick-firing (QF) guns,  QF Hotchkiss guns, and  QF Hotchkiss five-barreled revolving cannon. The ships could also carry 12-15 mines intended to be used to create a secure anchorage.

Armor
The armor thinned to  aft and  forward of the main belt. This outermost layer of armor was backed by 9 inches of teak reinforced with angle irons and then came the 1-inch inner armor plates, backed in its turn by another 9 inches of teak.

The turrets had 6 inches of armor, except around the gun ports, where it thickened to 6.5 inches, reinforced by 12 inches of teak. The deck armor was in two layers with a total thickness of 1 inch that were separated by a layer of cloth or felt to better deflect the glancing hits expected.

Ships

Construction and service

After launching, the sisters were transferred to Kronstadt for fitting out as the shallow waters around Saint Petersburg prevented deep-draft ships from being completed. This added more delays as the dockyard there lacked the equipment to efficiently fit out the ships. Both ships were assigned to the Baltic Fleet upon completion. They were not fully equipped until around 1872 and their trials continued until 1873. Admiral Spiridov accidentally rammed the monitor  in Kronstadt harbor in 1871, and her sister collided with the monitor  four years later; neither ship was seriously damaged. Several days after the collision, Admiral Chichagov struck a sandbank at full speed. While not damaged in the incident, she was very firmly stuck and early attempts to pull her off failed, during which one seaman was killed and an officer badly wounded. The monitor had to be unloaded as much as possible and her forward guns were removed before she was freed from the sandbank, five days after running aground.
 
The ships received electric dynamos and searchlights were installed in the late 1870s. Admiral Chichagov served as the flagship for Captain 1st Rank Stepan Makarov during the 1885 naval maneuvers in the approaches to the Gulf of Riga and her boilers were replaced in two years later. Steam-powered steering gear was installed in the sisters in 1887 and they were reclassified as coast-defense ironclads on 13 February 1892. By this time, their role in Russian war plans was to defend the Gulf of Riga against an anticipated German amphibious landing. In 1900 they were transferred to the Kronstadt Engineering School as training ships before they were transferred to the Port of Kronstadt on 31 March 1907 for disposal. The sisters were stricken on 14 August and Admiral Spiridov became a stationary coal-storage barge while Admiral Chichagov was grounded near Reval and used as a target. Their subsequent fates are unknown.

See also
 List of ironclads of Russia

Notes

Footnotes

References

Further reading

 
Naval ships of Russia
Ironclad warships of the Imperial Russian Navy